The first commercially issued recording of Gustav Mahler’s Eighth Symphony was performed by the Rotterdam Philharmonic Orchestra conducted by Eduard Flipse. It was recorded live by Philips at the 1954 Holland Festival. In 1962, the New York Philharmonic conducted by Leonard Bernstein made the first stereo recording of Part I for Columbia Records. This was followed in 1964 by the first stereo recording of the complete symphony, performed by the Utah Symphony conducted by Maurice Abravanel.

Since the Eighth was first recorded at least 70 recordings of it have been made, by many of the world's leading orchestras and singers, mostly during live performances. This number includes recordings which were for private or limited distribution and were not issued under commercial record labels.

Some of the recordings have won high critical praise. On its first release in CD form in 1988 the historic Stokowski recording was described by critic Kevin Conklin as "the most consistently satisfying performance of the Mahler Eighth I know, and a powerful argument for preferring a live recording of the work". Simon Rattle's 2004 version with the City of Birmingham Symphony Orchestra was BBC Music Magazine Disc of the Month for May 2005, and was Gramophone magazine's Disc of the Month in April 2007. A Leonard Bernstein 1975 recording, when issued in DVD format in 2005, was Gramophones DVD of the Month choice in February 2006. The DVD of the Klaus Tennstedt 1991 recording, praised for its "passionate commitment", was a finalist in the annual Gramophone Awards in 2007.

Audio recordings

Audio recordings in limited circulation
These recordings were issued for private or limited circulation.

Video recordings

Notes and referencesNotesReferences'

Mahler 8
Discography 08